David Leavitt (born June 23, 1961) is an American novelist, short story writer, and biographer.

Biography
Leavitt was born in Pittsburgh, Pennsylvania to Harold and Gloria Leavitt. Harold was a professor who taught at Stanford University and Gloria was a political activist. Leavitt graduated from Yale University with a B.A. in English in 1983. After his first book's success, he spent much of the 1990s living in Italy working and restoring an old house in Semproniano in Tuscany with his partner. He has also taught at Princeton University.

While a student at Yale, Leavitt published two stories in The New Yorker, "Territory" and "Out Here", both of which were included in his first collection, Family Dancing (nominated for the National Book Critics Circle Award and finalist for the PEN/Faulkner Award). Other published fiction includes the short-story collections A Place I've Never Been, Arkansas: Three Novellas and The Marble Quilt and the novels The Lost Language of Cranes, Equal Affections, While England Sleeps (finalist for the Los Angeles Times Fiction Prize), The Page Turner, Martin Bauman, The Body of Jonah Boyd and The Indian Clerk (finalist for the PEN/Faulkner Award and shortlisted for the IMPAC Dublin Award).

In 2000, Leavitt moved to Gainesville, Florida, and became a member of the Creative Writing faculty at the University of Florida as well as the founder and editor of the literary journal Subtropics.

Leavitt, who is gay, has frequently explored gay issues in his works. As a teenager, he was frequently frightened by gay novels that emphasized the ideal male body. He found this theme, and its suggestion that homoerotic fulfillment was reserved for the exceptionally beautiful young men, intrusive. His writing explores universal themes such as complex family relationships and class and sex exploitation. Illness and death are also recurrent themes in his work, inspired by his experience with his mother's cancer and death when he was growing up.

Despite writing many novels, Leavitt has said he feels more confident as a short story writer. He has been criticized for writing too quickly, which he attributes to early experiences with death convincing him that his life as a writer would be short. His work has been considered minimalist as well as part of the literary Brat Pack, but he has made "a fierce effort to disassociate" himself from both. He considers his works too long, emotional and descriptive to be minimalist.

Leavitt’s favorite novelist is Penelope Fitzgerald, his favorite works of hers being The Beginning of Spring, The Gate of Angels and The Blue Flower. He has also been influenced by John Cheever, Alice Munro, Cynthia Ozick, Joseph Roth, W. G. Sebald, and Grace Paley, whom he credits for teaching him the importance of humble experiences in great fiction.

Copyright suit
In 1993, the English poet Stephen Spender sued Leavitt for copyright infringement over the publication of his novel While England Sleeps, accusing him of using elements of Spender's memoir World Within World in the novel. Viking-Penguin, Leavitt's publisher at the time, withdrew the book. In 1995, Houghton Mifflin published a revised version with a preface by Leavitt addressing the controversy.

In "Courage in the Telling: The Critical Rise and Fall of David Leavitt", Drew Patrick Shannon argues that the critical backlash that accompanied Spender's suit "allowed [critics] to reinforce the boundaries between gay and mainstream literature that Leavitt had previously crossed". Subsequent reviews of Leavitt's work were more favorable. The episode provided Leavitt with the basis for his novella The Term-Paper Artist.

Adaptations
Two of Leavitt's novels have been filmed: The Lost Language of Cranes (1991) was directed by Nigel Finch and The Page Turner (released under the title Food of Love) was directed by Ventura Pons. The rights to a third, The Indian Clerk, have been optioned by Scott Rudin.

Writings

Collections
Family Dancing (1984)
A Place I've Never Been (1990)
Arkansas (1997)
The Marble Quilt (2001)

Novels
The Lost Language of Cranes (1986)
Equal Affections (1989)
While England Sleeps (1993; revised and reissued 1995)
The Page Turner  (1998)
Martin Bauman (2000)
The Body of Jonah Boyd (2004)
The Indian Clerk (2007)
The Two Hotel Francforts (2013)
Shelter in Place (2020)

Non-fiction
Florence, A Delicate Case (2003)
The Man Who Knew Too Much: Alan Turing and the Invention of the Computer (2006)

Co-authored and edited collections
The Penguin Book of Gay Short Stories (1993) (editor, with Mark Mitchell)
Italian Pleasures (1996) (with Mark Mitchell)
Pages Passed from Hand to Hand: The Hidden Tradition of Homosexual Literature in English from 1748 to 1914 (1997) (editor, with Mark Mitchell)
In Maremma: Life and a House in Southern Tuscany (2001) (with Mark Mitchell)

Anthologies 
"Chips Is Here." The Company of Dogs , edited by Michael J. Rosen, Doubleday (1990)

References

External links
 Official website 
 Faculty page at the University of Florida
 Website for Subtropics magazine
 BBC Radio 4 Interview about The Body of Jonah Boyd
 Econoculture Interview, February 2, 2006 by Paul Morton
 Interview with Identity Theory
 David Leavitt Papers. Yale Collection of American Literature, Beinecke Rare Book and Manuscript Library.

1961 births
Living people
20th-century American novelists
21st-century American novelists
American male novelists
American short story writers
American gay writers
Gay Jews
Gay novelists
Princeton University faculty
University of Florida faculty
Novelists from Florida
Writers from Pittsburgh
Yale University alumni
Jewish American novelists
American LGBT novelists
American male short story writers
LGBT people from Florida
LGBT people from Pennsylvania
PEN/Faulkner Award for Fiction winners
20th-century American male writers
21st-century American male writers
Novelists from Pennsylvania
Novelists from New Jersey
21st-century American Jews
21st-century LGBT people